Before 30, also known as B430 is a Nigerian television drama series directed by Bodunrin 'BB' Sasore and starring Damilola Adegbite, OC Ukeje, Beverly Naya, Meg Otanwa and Anee Icha. The show which is sponsored by Airtel Nigeria, set and shot in Lagos, started airing on DStv's Africa Magic on 29 March 2015. First Bank is also a co-sponsor of the show.

The show is centred on "the lives of four young and urban career women in Lagos as they face pressures from society and culture, their peers and family members on the condition to be married before they turn 30".

Cast and characters

Main characters
Damilola Adegbite as Temilola Coker, a 27-year-old lawyer and the only child of the Coker family. She tries daily to balance her own desire to find true love with the pressure from family to just be married.
OC Ukeje as Ayo, Temi's high school lover, who sees marriage as an unnecessary distraction at the present stage in his career. He is in love with Temi, but unable to pay enough attention to her emotional needs.
Beverly Naya as Nkem, the sexy and fun career woman who believes men are simply playthings. She is very blunt and direct.
Meg Otanwa as Aisha, a young woman from a conservative Muslim family, who has never really been able to choose who she wants to be. She is married to a wealthy man, but she's trying to adjust to the ups and downs of marriage.
Anee Icha as Ama, a free spirited lady, youngest in the group with a rosy outlook on life. She is very spiritual, and is not afraid to share her faith with anyone.

Recurring characters
Karibi Fubara as Akin, a 35-year-old single sociologist. He is a kindhearted humanitarian, but doesn't have the best track record with relationships. He is however willing to change and settle down when he meets Temi.
Patrick Diabuah as Sheriff, a 31-year-old billionaire heir to an oil and gas empire. He is married to Aisha and is a man with old-fashioned Northern values, despite his western education. He is generous and smart, but has a sense of entitlement that comes with growing up in the upper class.
Gideon Okeke
Patrick Doyle
Tina Mba as Aisha's mother

Guest appearances
Zainab Balogun
Tunbosun Aiyedehin
Vimbai Mutinhiri
Kenneth Okoli
Ebisan
Demola Adedoyin

Production and release
According to the series' producers, the show aims to "shed some light on the issues the average single Nigerian woman faces daily in her quest to become a wife, as each of the characters covers various social, physical, economic, religious and cultural aspects of the Nigerian woman, thereby creating a cast that everyone can relate to in some way". Pre-production for the first season of the show began in March 2012 with casting calls and audition, which took 6 months. The casts for the four lead actresses was finalised in June 2013, and principal photography started in February 2014. Most parts of the season was shot at Federal Palace Hotel, Lagos, which is one of the show's sponsors. shooting ended in April 2014. According to the producers, the series costs approximately ₦7 million ($45,000) per episode.

Character posters of Before 30 was released online in February 2015. The official trailer was also release at the period. The series premiered at Federal Palace Hotel on 20 March 2015, and started airing on DStv's Africa Magic on 29 March 2015; it was initially scheduled to start airing on 22 March, but was postponed to 29. The series is also aired on other cable and terrestrial television channels, such as: ELTV, Silverbird, Sound City, amongst other channels. Before 30 is currently available for streaming on Demand Africa.

It started streaming on Netflix on November 24, 2020.

References

External links 

 
 Before 30 on DemandAfrica

2015 Nigerian television series debuts
2010s Nigerian television series
English-language television shows
Nigerian drama television series
Television shows set in Lagos
Nigerian television soap operas
Africa Magic original programming